Christian Hjermind (born 25 July 1973 in Copenhagen, Denmark) is a former Danish professional team handball player.

Hjermind played club handball for HIK Håndbold, and was the top goalscorer of the club in the 1995 Danish Handball League season. 
He moved abroad to play for SG Flensburg-Handewitt in Germany and BM Ciudad Real in Spain. He returned to Denmark to play for KIF Kolding in 2003. He played four seasons with KIF, winning two Danish Handball League championships and two Danish Handball Cup trophies, before moving back to Ciudad Real in 2007.

He represented the Danish national handball team at the 2002 European Championship, winning bronze medals, the 2003 World Championship, the 2004 European Championship, winning bronze medals, and the 2005 World Championship.

Honours

Danish Handball League: 2005, 2006
Danish Handball Cup: 2005, 2007

References

1973 births
Living people
Danish male handball players
Danish expatriate sportspeople in Germany
Danish expatriate sportspeople in Spain
Handball players from Copenhagen